The Newcastle and Gateshead Water Company supplied drinking water to the towns of Newcastle upon Tyne and Gateshead, in the north east of England, from 1845 until 1974. It was initially called the Whittle Dean Water Company, but changed its name in 1863, and gradually increased the area which it supplied. It became part of the Northumbrian Water Authority in 1974 when the UK water companies were nationalized.

Early history
Newcastle and Gateshead were relatively small places despite being important for the export of coal, and it was not until the arrival of the railways in the second quarter of the nineteenth century that the population began to increase significantly. It became an important centre for engineering, a chemical industry developed, and following improvements to the River Tyne by the Tyne Improvement Commission, established in 1850, the trade in coal increased rapidly.

Both towns were initially dependent on springs for the supply of water, but in 1680 Cuthbert Dykes built an engine at Sandgate to supply Newcastle with water extracted from the Tyne. Details are not known, but it was presumably water powered. In Gateshead, water was obtained from springs located outside of the town and supplied to the residents by the Ellison family. Both schemes were superseded by a new system, proposed by William Yarnold in 1697. He negotiated with the Common Council of Newcastle to allow him to lay pipes and build storage cisterns, but also took the precaution of obtaining an Act of Parliament to authorise the works, which was granted in 1698. Water for both towns was obtained from springs at Heworth Common, to the south of Gateshead. He built two reservoirs with earth embankments in Gateshead, and the water was distributed through wooden pipes. The supply to Newcastle was carried across the Tyne Bridge in a lead pipe, and fed the cisterns, from where it was piped to houses. The supply was only available on one day a week, with some  being supplied each week, but the scheme was not a financial success, and Yarnold soon left. Nevertheless, the works continued to operate until 1770, supplying 161 properties. During this period the Common Council also supplied water to street fountains, known locally as pants, at no cost to the residents.

In 1769 Ralph Lodge proposed taking over the Common Council's supply, but they did not give their full approval. He bought up Yarnold's works, so that there would not be two competing systems in the towns, and although there were complaints from the Council in 1785, with the Council threatening to obtain their own Act of Parliament to construct works if things did not improve, they did not pursue this course of action, and Lodge's works continued to operate until 1797, when they were taken over by an insurance company, the Newcastle Fire Office. They sunk a shaft at Coxlodge, to tap into flooded coal workings, and the water fed a new reservoir on Town Moor through a  diameter pipe.
 
1831 was a disastrous year for the Newcastle Fire Office, as some of their springs dried up and the shaft was damaged, requiring them to construct a new one. They used carts to distribute river water to customers while trying to resolve the situation, which led to an outbreak of cholera. Between December 1831 and March 1832, 306 people died of the disease in Newcastle and 234 in Gateshead. The link between the use of river water and the disease was not clearly understood at the time, and after the epidemic was over, the company proposed a scheme to filter river water on a permanent basis, but did not proceed with this option.

Newcastle Subscription Water Company
The Newcastle Subscription Water Company was first proposed in November 1832, at the same time as the Newcastle Fire Office were expressing their regrets at their difficulties. While the prospectus for the new company made much of service to the townspeople, the aims were clearly to break the monopoly of the Newcastle Fire Office and to make money for investors. There was some hostility between the two companies, and when a bill was put before Parliament, the Corporation found that they did not have the powers to allow the new company to open up the streets to lay water mains, as they had previously granted exclusive rights to do this to the old company. Petitions were presented both for and against the new company, and there were allegations that the Newcastle Fire Office withheld water for fire fighting if a building was not insured with them. The bill eventually became an Act of Parliament on 22 May 1834.

The Fire Office sought tenders for new cast-iron pipes, to replace wooden ones, and the enlargement of Swan Pond to form Carr Hill reservoir. The Subscription Company could only supply Newcastle and the surrounding settlements, with Gateshead specifically excluded. They constructed a pumping station at Elswick, to pump water from the river to a reservoir at Arthur's Hill. Much of the work was carried out before the enabling Act of Parliament was obtained. Robert Hawthorn supplied the pump in 1834, it being the first Cornish engine to be manufactured in the North-East. The designer of the works is unclear, with Thomas Hawksley,  Joseph Glynn and Joshua Richardson all claiming to have done so.

Antagonism between the two companies continued for a short while, but in 1836 the Fire Office sold their works to the Subscription Company for £15,000. The new company thus were able to supply Gateshead as well as Newcastle, and served a population of some 80,000. Water was still only supplied intermittently, and this caused controversy when fires broke out, although the directors of the Subscription Company also owned the Tyne Mercury newspaper, which did not report events if they were not favourable to the company's reputation. In the aftermath of a fire at John Atkinson's coachworks, where water had not initially been available, a new company was proposed. Newcastle were supportive of the plans for Newcastle and Gateshead Union Water Company, but Gateshead appointed a committee to check progress, and as the bill went through Parliament, proposed significant changes, including the requirement that the mains should be pressurised at all times. An Act of Parliament was obtained on 19 June 1840, to allow extraction of water from the River Pont and from the drainage of Prestwick Carr, but no further progress was made. The Subscription Company tried to improve their supplies, but there were regular complaints that the water was sometimes brackish.

Whittle Dean Water Company
The 1840s saw Edwin Chadwick championing sanitation for the poor, with the publication of his Report on The Sanitary Condition of the Labouring Population of Great Britain in 1842 summing up three years of research. A Royal Commission then looked into the sanitary conditions in the major towns of England and Wales. Dr Robert Reid, who visited Newcastle in December 1843 and January 1844 for the Commission, found the poor living in overcrowded conditions. In Pipewellgate, just three privies served a population of 2,040. Water was sold to the rich relatively cheaply, but the poor paid five times as much for the same water. In a second report published by the Commission in 1845, Newcastle was criticised, because only 8 percent of the houses were supplied with water directly, the water was often of poor quality, and the charges to the poor were unjust.

During this period, plans were formulated for the Whittle Dean Water Company, with a reservoir at Whittle Dean, capable of holding a year's supply of water. The men behind the scheme were Richard Grainger, an eminent builder, Thomas Sopwith, a consulting engineer, and the industrialist William George Armstrong. They wrote to the Duke of Northumberland to see if they could carry out exploratory work, and were informed that the Duke would support the scheme if it was one in which the inhabitants of Newcastle would take an interest, rather than a private enterprise to make money for the promoters. Newcastle Council were impressed by the calibre of those promoting the company, which included medical doctors, the mayor and four former mayors, together with leading industrialists. A bill was presented to Parliament on 28 February 1845, and after Sopwith, Armstrong, Grainger and the engineer James Simpson gave evidence, it received Royal Assent on 30 June 1845. The Subscription Company had sought to oppose the bill, but agreed to sell their undertaking to the new company for £55,000. This allowed them to use the existing reservoirs and pipework of the Subscription Company, saving the cost of duplicating these facilities. A subscription list was opened, but after seven days, requests for shares totalling £160,000 had been received, and so it was closed again.

The Whittle Dean Water Company was established with a working capital of £150,000, and powers to borrow up to £50,000, if required. With Simpson as Chief Engineer, the company used the existing infrastructure while their new works were being constructed. They renewed the lease on Carr Hill reservoir, and found that the four reservoirs on Town Moor were better than expected, only needing to be cleaned and repaired. Simpson had pioneered the use of filters, and those at Elswick were renewed. Dawson, the superintendent, was asked to conduct experiments to see if water could be supplied every day, rather than every second day as had happened under the Subscription Company. A  pump was installed at Holmes Close ponds in Gateshead, to pump water to Carr Hill reservoir. Tenders to construct the reservoirs at Whittle Dean were invited on 16 January 1846, and the contract was awarded to Ridley and Atkinson on 11 February.

At the first annual general meeting held on 30 January 1846, the company pledged to provide a constant supply of water to all properties. Armstrong was appointed as Secretary to the Company, which would take over the offices of the Subscription Company in the Royal Arcade. Armstrong had previously written to the Town Council, suggesting that water from the mains could be used to power hydraulic cranes, to enable ships to be loaded and unloaded more cheaply, and since he offered to convert one of the cranes at his own expense to prove the concept, his offer was accepted. Its success led to further cranes being erected in 1847, and Armstrong formed a partnership with the Newcastle Craneage Company to manufacture hydraulic machinery, which led to the formation of the engineering industry and a significant increase in the population.

By February 1848, work on the reservoirs was nearly finished, but although the number of houses supplied directly with water had risen from 3,205 to 6,788 in the previous year, this still only represented about one third of the houses in the towns. By September, the pipeline was being tested, and the Whittle Dean works were completed in the following month. The benefit of the new scheme was soon seen, as there was a national outbreak of cholera in December 1848, but "Newcastle escaped almost unscathed", which was attributed to the unpolluted water supply. Nearby North Shields, which drew its water from the Tyne, was much less fortunate.

The directors decided to retain the Elswick works, to be used if the new works at Whittle Dean could not supply enough water. They were supplying water to an increasing number of industrial clients, and they were soon facing problems. Another small reservoir was built at Whittle Dean in 1850, but with rainfall in 1850 being the lowest for many years, water was also obtained from the Town Moor, the Coxlodge shaft and pumping from the Tyne restarted. Land surrounding the Whittle Dean reservoirs was drained to augment the supply, and negotiations to use the River Pont were started. The network was still being expanded rapidly, to supply additional houses and factories in Gateshead. The company opposed parts of Newcastle's Town Improvements Bill, as it would make digging up streets to lay pipes more difficult, and also promoted their own bill to include more parishes in their area of supply, to increase their working capital, and to regularise the construction of the Great Northern reservoir at Whittle Dean, which had already been built. The Act of Parliament was obtained in May 1853, and the company took pride in the fact that water was available 24 hours per day, whereas in London this would not be achieved until 1899. However, on 2 September 1853, the first of many to die of cholera occurred in Newcastle, and the company came under severe scrutiny from the town authorities.

Expansion

With deaths from cholera rising rapidly, the company hastily built a dam across the Matfen branch of the River Pont, which supplied  along a culvert to the Whittle Dean reservoirs in just three days. The cholera epidemic subsided after pumping was stopped on 15 September, but not before 1,527 deaths had occurred in Newcastle. A deputation from the Town Council on the same day was informed that the company had stopped pumping, and that it would never be restarted. This meant that they had to inform several industrial consumers that water would be severely limited until the emergency was over. They contacted the engineer James Simpson on 26 September to advise on how their resources could be increased, while the Town Council formed a committee to "regulate the sanitary measures in the town". They contacted John Frederick Bateman and Thomas Hawksley and considered setting up their own water company, but the idea was dropped as the Whittle Dean company made progress.

Simpson, working with the Whittle Dean engineer John Nicholson, produced a report on 24 October 1853, and a bill was submitted to Parliament. Negotiations with mill owners on the River Pont meant that they withdrew their objections, and the bill became an Act of Parliament on 2 June 1854. It would allow water to be taken from the River Pont, and conveyed to Whittle Dean by an aqueduct, where the Great Southern reservoir would be built. The Act included clauses, inserted by the Town Council, allowing them to buy the new works within ten years, and ensuring that water could only be pumped from the Tyne if they gave their consent. The works on the Town Moor were to be abandoned, as the water was contaminated by cattle.

A new pumping station was built at Newburn, which reused the engine from Elswick, and obtained water from the river after it had passed through  of gravel. The new reservoir at Whittle Dean was nearly completed by the end of 1855. Plans for the aqueduct to bring water from the River Pont were varied somewhat from the Parliamentary plans, and its size was subsequently increased. The final part of the scheme was an aqueduct to intercept streams between Hallington and Ryal, which included a tunnel. There were problems, with two contractors failing to complete it, but a third finally succeeded and the work was finished on 31 December 1859. A proposed reservoir at Elswick was moved to Benham, and a pumping engine to ensure houses in the higher parts of Newcastle could have water was installed, while pumps at Gateshead were upgraded. The unused site at Elswick was sold to the gas company.

Newcastle and Gateshead Water Company
Although the new works were finished, the company received regular complains and letters in the newspapers about the quality of the water. They approached Simpson, Hawksley and Bateman to see what could be done, and wrote to Newcastle Corporation explaining the difficulties. Bateman came to observe the situation in August 1861, and noted that the water contained vegetable and animal matter. He suggested changes to the way the Great Northern reservoir was used to improve the water quality, and that an additional engine was needed in Gateshead to pump water to Carr Hill reservoir. This was implemented, and one of the reservoirs was re-used as a cooling pond for the engines. Both Newcastle and Gateshead were expanding rapidly, onto higher ground away from the river, and most of the new houses had water closets, with many also having baths. The demand for water was increasing correspondingly.

Batesman's second report, produced on 8 October 1861, dealt with increasing supplies. He suggested diverting the Swinburn, building a new reservoir at Hallington, and installing a new pipeline between Newcastle and the Great Northern reservoir. Filters would be built at Benwell, supplied from a  pipeline from Newburn. The company then proposed a separate supply for manufacturers, pumped from the river, which would increase the amount of water available for domestic users. Bateman suggested that a new reservoir at Swinburn would be needed in due course. Further problems were caused by leakage from the reservoirs at Fenham and Benwell, due to the Delaval Coal Company mining coal from beneath them.

The company submitted a bill to Parliament for the new works, which was amended due to opposition from Newcastle Council, but received Royal Assent on 11 May 1863. The name of the company was changed to the Newcastle and Gateshead Water Company, its working capital was increased by £100,000, and authorised works included Hallington reservoir, two aqueducts which fed it, and pipelines from Newburn to Newcastle. The right of the Corporation to buy the works was reiterated, but only if they obtained the necessary Act of Parliament before 2 June 1864, as enshrined in the 1854 Act. While the bill was in Parliament, two of the directors, Sanderson and Tone, looked at whether pumping water from the North Tyne was an alternative to the Hallington reservoir, and found that costs would be similar. However, this avenue was not pursued at the time, although it was subsequently adopted in 1940.

There was a dispute between the company and Bateman soon afterwards. The company thought his charges were too high, while Bateman was unhappy with the quality of the workmanship at Benwell filters and on the pipeline. He wished not to be associated with such shoddy work, but some agreement was reached, and Bateman was appointed as Consulting Engineer for future works. With 1864 and 1865 being very dry years, larger engines were installed at Newburn. Work on Hallington reservoir did not start immediately, and another Act of Parliament was obtained in 1866, extending the time allowed to build it, and authorising a new aqueduct from Whittle Dean to Benwell via Throckley. Bateman oversaw the reservoir construction between 1868 and 1872. He subsequently designed filters at Throckley, a second reservoir at Hallington, a reservoir on the Swinburn and a service reservoir at Carr Hill.

Water and gas was carried between Newcastle and Gateshead by pipelines on the Tyne Bridge. In 1864 the Tyne Commissioners notified the company that they would be replacing the bridge with a swing bridge, and offered £10,000 to the company in compensation for the loss of the crossing. Both pipelines were routed over a temporary wooden bridge while the new bridge was being built, but both companies invested in a project to build Redheugh Bridge further upstream, and when it opened in 1871, it carried both services. The pumping station in Gateshead was moved to a new site at Rabbit Banks on Askew Road, nearer to the new river crossing, and a second-hand  beam engine was bought from the Manchester and Salford Water Company.

1874 was another year of drought, and the quantity and quality of the water supplied by the company again came under scrutiny. Robert Sterling Newall propounded a scheme to bring water  from Ullswater in the Lake District to Whittle Dean by gravity. There was considerable support in the press for this scheme, although the Daily Chronicle favoured a scheme to use the Northumberland Lakes, proposed by Thomas John Bewick. The River Coquet was also proposed as a potential source. There was significant support for taking over the water company in Newcastle Council  Meetings were held in Gateshead, at which it was suggested that water could be obtained from the Sunderland and South Shields Water Company instead. The discussions subsided a little with the coming of rain at the end of the year, although Newcastle Council passed a motion to take over the company in February 1875. Terms were nearly agreed, but the cost to the Corporation led to the decision being dropped in early 1876.

Two reservoirs were built on the Swinburn, known as Little Swinburn and Colt Crag. The contract for construction was awarded to Rigby of Worksop and work began in 1878. There were problems with leakage, but the company ignored Bateman's proposal to concrete over fissures in the Dry Burn, and used direct labour to make the repairs. There were also problems with movement of the embankment, and the Carr Hill service reservoir suffered from the same issue. Throckley filters were also affected by movement, and when one filter wall failed, it was blamed on poor workmanship. Direct labour was again used to fix the faults, and when West Hallington reservoir was built, this principle was extended, with Forster, the company's Resident Engineer, overseeing the work. Colt Crag reservoir remained problematic for some 20 years, and Bateman ceased to be the Consulting Engineer for the company after 1884. The construction of a second reservoir at Hallington, authorised by the Act of Parliament of 1876, began in 1884. There were delays, caused by slippage of the dams, bad weather in the winters of 1886 and 1887, and a spring beneath an embankment, but by May 1889 work was sufficiently complete that the reservoir started to fill.

With the number of customers supplied expected to reach 500,000 by 1908, and the volume of water required by then expected to be , Thomas Hawksley was asked to look at new sources in 1888. His report favoured using water from the River Rede and constructing a reservoir at Catcleugh. A  diameter pipeline would carry water from there to Hallington. Despite considerable opposition, an Act of Parliament was obtained in June 1889.

Bibliography

References

Former water companies of England
History of Newcastle upon Tyne